Cristian Nicolás Sánchez Prette (born 10 May 1985 in Río Cuarto) is an Argentine professional footballer, who plays as a midfielder.

Career 
Sánchez Prette came through the Club Atlético Huracán youth system to make his first team debut in 2003. He was part of the squad that obtained promotion to the Argentine First Division, and in the Apertura 2007 tournament he contributed a useful four goals, helping Huracán to finish in 7th place.

In May 2008 he agreed terms with Romanian club CFR Cluj for a fee of 1.100.000 euro, but returned to Argentina in January 2009 to join Estudiantes de La Plata on loan.

Sánchez Prette scored a number of significant goals for Estudiantes including 2 goals to help them qualify for the knockout phase of Copa Libertadores 2009 and a 94th-minute equaliser against local rivals Gimnasia y Esgrima de La Plata in the Clásico Platense. He was also part of the Copa Libertadores winning team despite not playing the final game against Cruzeiro.

During the winter transfer window CFR Cluj loaned Sánchez Prette to Newell's Old Boys. In July 2010, Sánchez Prette was signed by Barcelona on a one-year loan.

Honours
Estudiantes de La Plata
Copa Libertadores: 2009

References

External links
 
 Cristian Sánchez Prette at Football-lineups.com
 
 

1985 births
Living people
People from Río Cuarto, Córdoba
Argentine footballers
Association football midfielders
Club Atlético Huracán footballers
CFR Cluj players
Estudiantes de La Plata footballers
Newell's Old Boys footballers
Argentinos Juniors footballers
Barcelona S.C. footballers
Liga I players
Argentine Primera División players
Argentine expatriate footballers
Expatriate footballers in Romania
Expatriate footballers in Ecuador
Sportspeople from Córdoba Province, Argentina